The Waldo E. Smith Award, previously known as the Waldo E. Smith Medal, is given out by the American Geophysical Union to recognize "individuals who have played unique leadership roles in such diverse areas as scientific associations, education, legislation, research, public understanding of science, management, and philanthropy, and whose accomplishments have greatly strengthened and helped advance the geophysical sciences".  The award was created in 1982 and named after Waldo E. Smith, the first Executive Secretary of the AGU.  The award is given not more often than every other year.

Past recipients

Source (to 2012): AGU
Source (2014 onwards): AGU
 1984 Waldo E. Smith 
 1986 Thomas F. Malone
 1988 Philip H. Abelson
 1990 Naoshi Fukushima
 1992 Earl G. Droessler
 1994 Cecil H. Green
 1996 Ned Ostenso
 1998 Margaret A. Shea
 2000 Rosina Bierbaum
 2002 Ivan I. Mueller
 2004 J. Michael Hall
 2006 John A. Knauss
 2008 Harsh K. Gupta
 2010 A.F. Spilhaus, Jr.
 2012 David Simpson
 2014: Meinrat Andreae
 2016: Mark B. Moldwin
 2018: M. Meghan Miller

See also

 List of geophysics awards
 List of geophysicists
 List of prizes named after people

References

Smith
Awards established in 1982
1982 establishments in the United States